Janas is a surname. Notable people with the surname include:

John Janas (1910–1969), American politician
Piotr Janas (born 1970), Polish artist
Paweł Janas (born 1953), Polish footballer and manager
Lorelei Lee (born Amy Janas, 1982), American wrestler

See also
Janus (surname)